Guillamon or Guillamón may refer to:

 Guillamon Island, Highland, Scotland
 Costa y Guillamón, La Paz, Canelones Department, Uruguay

People 
 Hugo Guillamón (born 2000), Spanish professional footballer
 Antoine Guillamon (born 1991), French rugby union player
 Juan Carlos Guillamón (born 1974), Spanish cyclist
 Julià Guillamon (born 1962), Spanish writer and literary critic
 Vicente Alejandro Guillamón (born 1930), Spanish journalist and writer